Ricardo Fischer (born May 16, 1991) is a Brazilian professional basketball player who currently plays for Flamengo in the Novo Basquete Brasil (NBB). Fischer has also represented the senior Brazilian national basketball team.

Professional career
In his pro career, Fischer has played in both the 2nd-tier South American League, and the 1st-tier FIBA Americas League. He has also played in the European-wide 2nd-tier level EuroCup.

Flamengo
On 7 July 2016, Flamengo announced Fischer as their major signing for the 2016–17 NBB season in Brazil.

Bilbao Basket
On 5 July 2017, Fischer signed a two-year deal with the Spanish club Bilbao Basket. On March 1, 2018, Fischer part ways with Bilbao Basket.

National team career
Fischer played with the senior men's Brazilian national basketball team at the 2015 Pan American Games, where he won a gold medal, and at the 2015 FIBA Americas Championship, in Mexico City.

NBB career statistics

NBB regular season

NBB playoffs

References

External links
 Ricardo Fischer at EuroCup
 
 Ricardo Fischer at Latinbasket.com
 Ricardo Fischer at ESPN.com
 Ricardo Fischer at Spanish League 
 Ricardo Fischer at NBB 

1991 births
Living people
Associação Bauru Basketball players
Basketball players at the 2015 Pan American Games
Bilbao Basket players
Brazilian expatriate basketball people in Spain
Brazilian men's basketball players
Flamengo basketball players
Liga ACB players
Novo Basquete Brasil players
Pan American Games gold medalists for Brazil
Pan American Games medalists in basketball
Point guards
São José Basketball players
Sport Club Corinthians Paulista basketball players
Basketball players from São Paulo
Medalists at the 2015 Pan American Games